The XII International Brigade was mustered on 7 November 1936 at Albacete, Spain. It was formerly named the Garibaldi Brigade, after the most famous and inspiring leader in the Italian Independence Wars, General Giuseppe Garibaldi.

Structure
Its first commanding officer was a Soviet advisor of Hungarian origin, Gen. "Pavol Lukács" (Máté Zalka), who went on to command the 45th Division of the Spanish Republican Army (he was killed during the Huesca Offensive), and its first political commisar was Gustav Regler.

The brigade included, among others, the following battalions:

Garibaldi Battalion – Albanian, Italian and Spanish volunteers, led by Randolfo Pacciardi.
André Marty Battalion – Franco-Belgian volunteers (named after André Marty).
Dabrowski Battalion also known as the Dombrowski Battalion – exiled Polish volunteers
Thaelmann Battalion – German and Austrian volunteers (named after Ernst Thälmann), led by Ludwig Renn.
Figlio Battalion – Spanish volunteers
Madrid Battalion – Spanish volunteers
Prieto Battalion – Spanish volunteers

The Brigade fought in the battles of Madrid, the Corunna Road, Guadalajara, Guadarrama and Brunete.

See also
International Brigades
International Brigades order of battle

References

Bibliography
Beevor, Antony. The Battle for Spain. The Spanish Civil War 1936–1939. Penguin Books. London. 2006. 
Thomas, Hugh. The Spanish Civil War. Penguin Books. London. 2001. 

Military units and formations established in 1936
International Brigades
Mixed Brigades (Spain)
Military units and formations disestablished in 1939